Anne-Mette Fernandes is a former women's cricketer for the Denmark national women's cricket team who played two ODIs during the 1989 Women's European Cricket Cup. She only batted in one of the matches, scoring two runs, and did not bowl.

References

Danish women cricketers
Denmark women One Day International cricketers
Living people
Year of birth missing (living people)